The Ancient Mariner is the title character of Samuel Taylor Coleridge's poem The Rime of the Ancient Mariner.

Ancient Mariner may also refer to:

The Ancient Mariner (film), 1925 silent film based on the poem
Ancient Mariner (cocktail), a cocktail first documented in 1998

See also
Rime of the Ancient Mariner (disambiguation)